The Brazilian Armed Forces are the unified military forces of the Federative Republic of Brazil. Consisting of three service branches, it comprises the Brazilian Army (including the Brazilian Army Aviation), the Brazilian Navy (including the Brazilian Marine Corps and Brazilian Naval Aviation) and the Brazilian Air Force (including the Aerospace Operations Command).

Brazil's armed forces are the second largest in the Americas, after the United States, and the largest in Latin America and the Southern Hemisphere by the level of military equipment, with 334,500 active-duty troops and officers. Brazilian soldiers were in Haiti from 2004 until 2017, leading the United Nations Stabilization Mission (MINUSTAH).

Organization
The Armed Forces of Brazil are divided into 3 branches:
 Brazilian Army
Brazilian Army Aviation Command
 Brazilian Navy
Brazilian Marine Corps
Brazilian Naval Aviation
 Brazilian Air Force
Aerospace Operations Command

The Military Police (state police) alongside the Military Firefighters Corps are described as an auxiliary and reserve force of the Army. All military branches are part of the Ministry of Defence.

The Brazilian Navy which is the oldest of the Brazilian Armed Forces, includes the Brazilian Marine Corps and the Brazilian Naval Aviation.

Service obligation and manpower
18–45 years of age for compulsory military service; conscript service obligation – 10 to 12 months; 17–45 years of age for voluntary service. An increasing percentage of the ranks are "long-service" volunteer professionals; women were allowed to serve in the armed forces beginning in the early 1980s when the Brazilian Army became the first army in South America to accept women into career ranks; women serve in Navy and Air Force only in Women's Reserve Corps.

Mission and challenges
South America is a relatively peaceful continent in which wars are a rare event; as a result, Brazil hasn't had its territory invaded since year 1865 during the Paraguayan War. Additionally, Brazil has no contested territorial disputes with any of its neighbours and neither does it have rivalries, like Chile and Bolivia have with each other. However, Brazil is the only country besides China and Russia that has land borders with 10 or more nations. Overall, the Armed Forces have to defend 8.5 million km2 (around 3.2 million sq. mi.) of land and patrol 4.4 million km2 (around 1.7 million sq. mi.) of territorial waters – or Blue Amazon, as the Brazilian Navy calls them. To achieve this mission, significant manpower and funding is required.

Military history of Brazil

Since 1648 the Brazilian Armed Forces have been relied upon to fight in defense of Brazilian sovereignty and to suppress civil rebellions. The Brazilian military also has three times intervened militarily to overthrow the Brazilian government.

The Brazilian Armed Forces were subordinated to the Emperor, its Commander-in-Chief. He was aided by the Ministers of War and Navy in regard to matters concerning the Army and the Armada, respectively. Traditionally, the Ministers of War and Navy were civilians but there were some exceptions. The model chosen was the British parliamentary or Anglo-American system, in which "the country's Armed Forces observed unrestricted obedience to the civilian government while maintaining distance from political decisions and decisions referring to borders' security".

The military personnel were allowed to run and serve in political offices while staying on active duty. However, they did not represent the Army or the Armada but instead the population of the city or province where elected. Dom Pedro I chose nine military personnel as Senators and five (out of 14) to the State Council. During the Regency, two were chosen to the Senate and none to the State Council as there was no Council at the time. Dom Pedro II chose four military personnel to become Senators during the 1840s, two in the 1850s and three until the end of his reign. He also chose seven military personnel to be State Counselors during the 1840s and 1850s and three after that.

It has built a tradition of participating in UN peacekeeping missions such as in Haiti and East Timor. Below a list of some of the historical events in which the Brazilian Armed Forces took part:

Armed conflicts involving Brazil

 First Battle of Guararapes (1648): Decisive Portuguese victory that helped end Dutch occupation. Due to this battle, the year 1648 is considered as the year of the foundation of the Brazilian Army.
 Invasion of Cayenne (1809) (1809) : Was a combined military operation by an Anglo-Portuguese expeditionary force against Cayenne, capital of the French South American colony of French Guiana in 1809, during the Napoleonic Wars.
 Luso-Brazilian invasion (1816–1820) : Was an armed conflict between the United Kingdom of Portugal, Brazil and the Algarves and the partisans of José Artigas over the Banda Oriental (Eastern Bank), present-day Uruguay.
 Brazilian War of Independence (1822–1824): Series of military campaigns that had as objective to cement Brazilian sovereignty and end Portuguese resistance.
 Confederation of the Equator (1824) : Was a short-lived rebellion that occurred in the northeastern region of Brazil during that nation's struggle for independence from Portugal.
 Cisplatine War (1825–1828) : Armed conflict over an area known as Banda Oriental or "Eastern Shore" between the United Provinces of the Río de la Plata and Empire of Brazil in the aftermath of the United Provinces' emancipation from Spain.
 Ragamuffin War (1835–1845) : Was a Republican uprising that began in southern Brazil, in the states of Rio Grande do Sul and Santa Catarina in 1835. The rebels, led by Generals Bento Gonçalves da Silva and Antônio de Sousa Neto with the support of the Italian fighter Giuseppe Garibaldi, surrendered to imperial forces in 1845.
 Platine War (1851–1852): The Brazilian Empire and its allies went to war against the dictator Juan Manuel de Rosas of the Argentine Confederation.
 Uruguayan War (1864–1865): Brazilian intervention in Uruguay. With support from Argentina, imperial forces deposed President Atanasio Aguirre from office and instated general Venancio Flores in his place.
 Paraguayan War (1864–1870): Over 200,000 Brazilians fought on this conflict, which is considered as the most serious in Brazilian history.
 Brazilian Naval Revolt (1893–1894) : Were armed mutinies promoted mainly by Admirals Custodio de Mello and Saldanha da Gama and their fleet of Brazilian Navy ships against unconstitutional staying in power of the central government in Rio de Janeiro.
 War of Canudos (1893–1897): The deadliest rebellion of Brazil, the insurrectionists defeated the first 3 military forces sent to quell the rebellion.
 Contestado War (1912–1916) : Was a guerrilla war for land between settlers and landowners, the latter supported by the Brazilian state's police and military forces. The war lasted from October 1912 to August 1916.
 Brazil during World War I: Brazil entered into World War I in 1917 alongside the Triple Entente. Brazil's effort in World War I occurred mainly in the Atlantic campaign, with a smaller participation in the land warfare.
 Constitutionalist Revolution (1932) : Was the armed movement occurred in the State of São Paulo, Brazil, between July and October 1932, which aimed at the overthrow of the Provisional Government of Getúlio Vargas and the promulgation of a new constitution for Brazil.
 Brazil in World War II (1942–1945): Brazil declared war on Nazi Germany in August 1942 and in 1944 sent an Expeditionary Force of 25,334 soldiers to fight in Italy. Brazil also supplied vital raw materials for the war effort and ceded important airbases at Natal and Fernando de Noronha Archipel that made possible the North African invasion, i.e. Operation Torch, and had a key role in patrolling the South Atlantic sea lanes.
Brazilian Expeditionary Force, initially composed of an infantry division, eventually covered all Brazilian military forces who participated in the conflict, including the Brazilian Air Force who did a remarkable job in the last nine months of war with 445 missions executed. Offensive: 2546, Defensive: 4.

Brazilian military coups d'état
Although no military coups occurred during the 67 years of the Brazilian Empire, the Republican period experienced 4 military coups d'état in the 75 years between 1889 and 1964.
 Proclamation of the Republic (1889): End of the Brazilian Empire, this was the first coup d'état performed by the Brazilian military.
 Revolution of 1930: Second military overthrow of government, in which President Washington Luís was replaced by Getúlio Vargas, who became the Provisional President.
 End of Estado Novo (1945): Then Dictator Getúlio Vargas is deposed by generals and later General Eurico Dutra was elected president.
 1964 Brazilian coup d'état: President João Goulart is removed from office, leading to a military dictatorship which lasted until 1985.

Ministry of Defence

On 10 July 1999, the Ministry of Defence was created, with the abolition of the EMFA and the merger of all three ministries of the Armed Forces (Army, Navy and Air Force) into a singular ministry of the Cabinet.

Joint Staff of the Armed Forces

Joint Staff of the Armed Forces is an agency of the Ministry of Defense of Brazil, which centralizes the coordination of command of the armed forces: Army, Navy and Air Force. It was created by Complementary Law No. 136 of 25 August 2010, and has in Ordinance No. 1429 its operating guidelines.

Advising the Minister of Defense in the upper direction of the armed forces, aiming the organization, preparation and employment, in order to fulfill its constitutional mission and its subsidiaries assignments, with the goals strategic planning and the joint use of the military services.

It is up to JSAF plan together and integrated employment of staff of the Navy, Army and Air Force, optimizing the use of the military and logistical support in the defense of the country and in peacekeeping, humanitarian and rescue operations; border security; and civil defense actions.

The body has its powers and duties according to the Regimental Structure approved by Decree 7.9744, April 1, 2013. Since its inception, the JSAF has worked with the Central Administration of the Ministry of Defence, on the Esplanade of Ministries in Brasilia (DF).

The head of the JSAF is private of a general officer of the last post, active or reserve, designated by the Ministry of Defence and appointed by the president. Their hierarchical level is the same of the military commanders of the Navy, Army and Air Force. Under the coordination of the Joint Armed Forces also operates the Committee of Chiefs of Staffs of the military services.

The current head of JSAF is the Army General Renato Rodrigues de Aguiar Freire.

Current military leaders
The following are the current commanders of the three defence branches and the Joint Staff chief as of January 2023.

Brazilian Army

The Army High Command of Brazil is formed by the Army Commander and other army generals in active service. The country current have sixteen active 4-star generals, several of then in command posts. The mission of ACE include the selection of a list of candidates to the post of commander, the prospection of regional and global political situations, among others roles. All Brazilian generals are graduates of the Brazilian Superior War School.

FORPRON
The Brazilian Army Readiness Forces (Forças de Prontidão do Exército Brasileiro in Portuguese), is a division of the Army created to be ready for real combat 365 days per year. This division composed of 15,000 infantry troops, paratroopers and armored cavalry brigades is able to operate in real missions of conventional combat, law and order guarantee and interagency operations within the Brazilian territory or as divisional forces abroad led by officers from the General Staff of the Readiness Forces subordinate to the Army High Command.

Brazilian Navy

The navy has eight bases throughout Brazil.

Brazilian Air Force

The Brazilian Air Force (also known as FAB,  or ) is the second-largest air force in the Americas (behind only the United States) and has around 70,000 active personnel. The FAB is subdivided into four operational commands.

Brazilian aerospace command

The Aerospace Operations Command is a Brazilian air and space command created in 2017 and is part of the Brazilian Air Force.  It is responsible for planning, coordinating, executing and controlling the country's air and space operations.  The Brazilian Navy and Brazilian Army also are part of the organization.

Troop relocation

Brazil has the need to patrol its  of land borders. Since the 1990s Brazil has been relocating its forces in accordance to this national security requirement.

Between 1992 and 2008, the 1st, 2nd and 16th Jungle Infantry Brigades, the 3rd Infantry Battalion, the 19th Logistics Battalion, and the 22nd Army Police Platoon were transferred by the Army from the states of Rio de Janeiro and Rio Grande do Sul to the Amazon region in accordance with the friendship policy with Argentina. After those redeployments the number of Army troops in that region rose to 25,000. Also relocated from the state of Rio de Janeiro were the 1st and 3rd Combat Cars Regiment, now stationed in the city of Santa Maria, in the state of Rio Grande do Sul.

However, despite those efforts, the presence of the Armed Forces on the border regions of the Brazilian Amazon continues to be sparse and disperse, given the fact that the Army has just 28 border detachments in that area, a total of 1,600 soldiers, or 1 man for every  of borders. More redeployments are expected since the states of Rio de Janeiro, Minas Gerais and Espírito Santo still concentrate over 49,000 soldiers. In May 2008, the Navy announced new plans to reposition its forces throughout Brazil.

Communications and territorial surveillance
The Brazilian territory corresponds to 47.3% of the South American continent, and its land border is over 16.000 km and 4,5 million km2 of sea territory. With the objective of ensuring Brazil's sovereignty, strategic monitoring and communications projects have been launched in recent years.

SGDC

The Geostationary Defense and Strategic Communications Satellites or SGDC, are geostationary communication satellites developed by the Brazilian Air Force and the Brazilian Space Agency, created with the objective of operating strategic military, government and civil communications, also offering broadband internet throughout the national territory. The first satellite called SGDC-1, was launched in 2017 and the SGDC-2 has planned to launch in 2022. The Space Operations Center (COPE) was inaugurated in 2020, subordinated to the Aerospace Operations Command, with the objective of operating the satellites.

SISFRON

The Integrated Border Monitoring System (SISFRON) is a border system developed by the Brazilian Army for supporting operational employment decisions, operating in an integrated manner with all defense systems in the country, whose purpose is to strengthen the presence and capacity for monitoring and action in the national land border strip. Was conceived at the initiative of the Army Command, as a result of the approval of the National Defense Strategy in 2008, which guides the organization of the Armed Forces. The SISFRON are deployed along the 16,886 kilometers of the border line, favoring the employment of organizations subordinate to the North, West, Southern and the Amazon military commands.

SisGAAz
This area is home to a huge diversity of marine species, valuable metallic minerals and other mineral resources, petroleum, and the world's second largest rare-earth reserve. The SisGAAz integrates equipment and systems composed of radars incorporated on land and vessels, as well as high resolution cameras and features such as the fusion of information received from collaborative systems.

Link-BR2

The Link-BR2 is a datalink developed by the Air Force and the Brazilian defence company AEL Sistemas, this technology allow the exchange of data such radar information, videos and images with other units of the three branches anytime and anywhere, using an advanced encrypted protocol with a high degree of security.

See also
 Joint Staff of the Armed Forces
 Brazilian Naval Aviation
 Brazilian Navy
 Brazilian Army
 Brazilian Army Aviation
 Brazilian Air Force
 National Force of Public Safety
 National Defense Council (Brazil)
 Brazil and weapons of mass destruction
 Policing in Brazil
 Military Police of Brazilian States
 Rondas Ostensivas Tobias de Aguiar: Military Police of the State of São Paulo.
 BOPE: Special Police Operations Battalion of the Military Police of the State of Rio de Janeiro, Brazil.
 Military Police of Rio de Janeiro State
 List of Wars involving Brazil
 Military of the Empire of Brazil

References

Bibliography

External links

 Brazilian Ministry of Defence
 Brazil military profile from the CIA World Factbook
 Brazil military guide from GlobalSecurity.org